The Bern trolleybus system is part of the public transport network of Bern, the capital city of Switzerland.  Opened in 1940, it combines with the Bern S-Bahn, the Bern tramway network and Bern's urban motorbus network to form an integrated all-four style scheme.

It is operated by Städtische Verkehrsbetriebe Bern (SVB) (better known since 2000 by its trading name, Bernmobil), which also operates the tramway and motorbus networks. Like the other modes of public transport in the region, it is covered by the Tarifverbund Bern-Solothurn.

History
On 2 and 3 December 1939, the City of Bern's voters decided to introduce trolleybuses as a third form of urban public transport. The Bern trolleybus system went into operation on 29 October 1940 on line 12, between Bärengraben and Schosshalde, and served initially only as a tramway feeder.  The body initially responsible for running the new trolleybus system was the Städtische Strassenbahn Bern (SSB), while Stadt-Omnibus Bern (SOB) ran the city's motor bus services. Only on 1 September 1947 did the two companies merge, to form Städtische Verkehrsbetriebe Bern (SVB).

To avoid intersections between the trolleybus and tram lines, passengers using trolleybuses to travel into and out of the inner city had to change modes of transport at the Insel tram/bus stop.

On 9 May 1948, the Bümpliz line was converted back to motor bus operation.  In 1961, the Bahnhof Bern–Länggasse motor bus line was electrified to become part of trolleybus line 12.  Until 1959, this route had been a tram line, and had connected with trolleybus line 12 to the Schosshalde.  On 24 September 1972, the voters said "yes" to a template for the electrification of three further motor bus routes:

 Line 14 Bahnhof Bern–Bümpliz Unterführung–Gäbelbach on 27 October 1974;
 Line 20 Bahnhof Bern–Bahnhof Wankdorf on 15 April 1975
 Line 13 Bahnhof Bern–Bümpliz Unterführung (underpass)–Bümpliz on 28 July 1975.

Lines 13 and 14 were also extended in the course of electrification. Additionally, line 11 was opened on 18 May 1977, as a trolleybus line from Güterbahnhof (goods station) to Brückfeld.  On 5 May 1992, this line was extended again, for nearly half a kilometre, to the new Neufeld P+R facility.

On 1 July of that year, the trolleybus system then shrank significantly, as lines 13 and 14 were temporarily converted to motor bus operation during the project Tram Bern-West, until 2010, when the tramway network took over the operation of these two western branches.

In 2010, the Bern trolleybus system yielded the following statistics:
 Kilometres travelled: 1.439 million, representing 15 percent of Bernmobil's total transport volume
 Passengers carried: 21.762 million, representing 23 percent of Bernmobil's transport volume
 Passenger kilometers: 29.376 million, representing 16 percent of Bernmobil's total transport volume

Lines 
The present system is made up of the following lines:

Due to the lack of a turning circle at Wyleregg, the supplementary services that run on line 20 on school days are operated by diesel buses.

Fleet

Retired fleet 

(1) = Prior to entering service in Bern, trolleybus no. 30 was a demonstration vehicle for the Swiss trolleybus manufacturing, both domestically and abroad, for example, in Vancouver. After a heating unit failure, it was burned out in 1976, but was rebuilt in 1977 in the SVB workshop. Later, trolleybus no. 55 was used as a demonstration in Solingen and Arnhem, amongst other places.

(2) = Joint order with articulated buses nos. 61-70 of the Biel/Bienne trolleybus system.

(3) = Lent by the Neuchâtel trolleybus system, and used during the winters of 1992–93 and 1993–94. A proposed acquisition of these vehicles did not occur. No. 67 was formerly Neuchâtel 156, no. 68 was Neuchâtel 158, and no. 69 was Neuchâtel 160.

(4) = BGT-N demonstration vehicle, used on all of the Swiss trolleybus systems, except the Lugano system.

Additionally, between 1943 and 1960 a Saurer/Gangloff Type 4R trailer was in the fleet.  It was purchased by Stadt-Omnibus Bern, initially bore the number 101, and in 1956 was renumbered as 201.  The trailer was used with both trolleybuses and motorbuses, trolleybus no. 6 and motorbuses nos. 54 and 55 being equipped for towing it.

Preservation 

In 2006, the eleven vehicles with the fleet numbers 33, 34, 46, 53, 54 and 56 to 61 were delivered to the Brașov trolleybus system in Romania, where they are still in service.

Former Bernese trolleybuses nos. 13, 28 and 59 are now in the custody of the Tramvereins Bern (TVB) ("Bern Tram Association"), and trolleybus no. 38 is now owned by the Trolleybusvereins Schweiz (TVS) ("Switzerland Trolleybus Association"). Trolleybus no. 55 has been sent to the Obus-Museum Solingen e. V. ("Solingen Trolleybus Museum") in Germany, and is the only one of the five preserved Bernese trolley buses still in running order.

Current fleet 
The Bern trolleybus system has a fleet of 20 vehicles.  They are all BGT-N2 low-floor articulated buses with electrical equipment by Kiepe.  Also known as Swisstrolley 2s, they were purchased in two groups:

Nos. 1 to 8: 1997–1998
Nos. 9 to 20: 1999–2000

See also

List of trolleybus systems in Switzerland

References

Notes

Further reading

External links

 
 

Transport in Bern
Bern
Bern
1940 establishments in Switzerland